WILE (1270 AM) is a radio station  broadcasting a country music format. Licensed to Cambridge, Ohio, United States, the station is currently owned by Avc Communications.

Programming is simulcast on FM translator W253CF broadcasting at 98.5 FM and on W300CB broadcasting at 107.9 FM.

History
WILE began broadcasting April 9, 1948. It was operated by Land-O-Lakes Broadcasting Corporation.

References

External links

ILE
Country radio stations in the United States
Radio stations established in 1956
1956 establishments in Ohio